Bertha Irene Hart was an American mathematician. She had a Master of Arts degree from Cornell University, and was at one point an associate professor of mathematics for Western Maryland College.

Affiliations
In 1946 she was elected to “ordinary membership” of the American Mathematical Society.

She was elected as a Fellow of the American Association for the Advancement of Science in 1957. At that time she was also affiliated with the Ballistic Research Laboratory.

Notable publications
 “Significance Levels for the Ratio of the Mean Square Successive Difference to the Variance”, B. I. Hart, The Annals of Mathematical Statistics, Vol. 13, No. 4 (Dec., 1942), pp. 445–447
 “Tabulation of the Probabilities for the Ratio of the Mean Square Successive Difference to the Variance”, B. I. Hart, John von Neumann, The Annals of Mathematical Statistics, Vol. 13, No. 2 (Jun., 1942), pp. 207–214
 The Mean Square Successive Difference, J. von Neumann, R. H. Kent, H. R. Bellinson, B. I. Hart, The Annals of Mathematical Statistics, Vol. 12, No. 2 (Jun., 1941), pp. 153–162

References

American mathematicians
American women mathematicians
Fellows of the American Association for the Advancement of Science
Women mathematicians
Cornell University alumni